Eric Errol Keddo (born 1 July 1984 in Texas, United States) is a Jamaican hurdler who specializes in the 110 metres hurdles.

He competed at the 2010 Commonwealth Games where he placed 4th in the 110 meter hurdles missing bronze by 0.01 seconds. Also in 2010, he finished second at the 2010 Central American and Caribbean Games. In 2011, he won the gold medal at the 2011 Central American and Caribbean Championships  with a personal best of 13.49 seconds.

Personal bests
His personal best time, in the 110 meter hurdles, is 13.49 seconds.

Outdoor
200 m: 21.57 s (wind: +1.1 m/s) –  Charlotte, North Carolina, 11 April 2009
400 m: 48.92 s –  Columbia, South Carolina, 31 March 2007
110 m hurdles: 13.49 s (wind: +0.7 m/s) –  Mayagüez, 17 July 2011
400 m hurdles: 51.15 s –  Atlanta, Georgia, 14 May 2005

Indoor
60 m hurdles: 7.65 s –  Clemson, South Carolina, 13 February 2009

Competition record

References

External links
Tilastopaja biography

Living people
1984 births
Athletes (track and field) at the 2011 Pan American Games
Athletes (track and field) at the 2010 Commonwealth Games
Jamaican male hurdlers
Central American and Caribbean Games silver medalists for Jamaica
Competitors at the 2010 Central American and Caribbean Games
Competitors at the 2014 Central American and Caribbean Games
Central American and Caribbean Games medalists in athletics
Commonwealth Games competitors for Jamaica
Pan American Games competitors for Jamaica